Anthony Dawson was a Scottish actor.

Anthony Dawson may also refer to:

Anthony M. Dawson (1930–2002), pseudonymous Italian filmmaker, real name Antonio Margheriti
Anthony Dawson (equestrian), represented South Africa at the 2012 Summer Paralympics
Anthony Dawson (physician) (1928–1997), British gastroenterologist
Andy Archer (radio presenter) (born 1946), British radio presenter, born Anthony Dawson

See also
Tony Dawson (disambiguation)